Südergellersen is a municipality in the district of Lüneburg, in Lower Saxony, Germany.

Localities 
 Heiligenthal

References